Ramsayia was a genus of giant wombat, weighing around 100 kg. Ramsayia went extinct in the Late Pleistocene.

References 

Prehistoric vombatiforms
Prehistoric marsupial genera